The abbreviation TSE can refer to:

Education
Toulouse School Of Economics, in Toulouse, France
Turku School of Economics, in Turku, Finland
TSE (examination), Test of Spoken English

Health
Testicular self-examination
Transmissible spongiform encephalopathy
Turbo spin echo, a sequence of magnetic resonance imaging

Media

Computer gaming
The Spirit Engine, a side-scrolling role-playing game
The Subspace Emissary, a mode in Super Smash Bros. Brawl

Music
The Sweet Escape, a Gwen Stefani album released in 2006
"The Sweet Escape" (song)
The Sweet Escape Tour, in support of the album
This Strange Engine, a Marillion album released in 1997, or the title track

Publications
IEEE Transactions on Software Engineering

Web

Organizations
An old IATA airport code for Nursultan Nazarbayev International Airport, now NQZ
Superior Electoral Court (TSE), the highest electoral court in Brazil
Supreme Electoral Court (disambiguation) (TSE), a name given to a number of different courts in South America
Turkish Standards Institution (TSE), a public standards organization in Turkey

Stock exchanges
Taiwan Stock Exchange
Tallinn Stock Exchange
Tehran Stock Exchange
Tirana Stock Exchange
Tokyo Stock Exchange
Toronto Stock Exchange, which has since changed its abbreviation to TSX

People
T. S. Eliot, Anglo-American poet
Thomas Sayers Ellis, American poet
Thomas Saunders Evans, was an eminent British scholar of and translator into Latin and Ancient Greek
Tse, a Chinese surname, Cantonese spelling of Xie (谢)

Religion
The Sacred Scriptures Bethel Edition

Technology
Windows NT 4.0 Terminal Server Edition, a Microsoft operating system
Torque Shader Engine, a video game engine used in Xbox and Xbox 360 console systems
The SemWare Editor, a text editor for DOS, OS/2, Windows, and Linux
Truck stop electrification, a plan to reduce idling of highway trucks

Other uses
Texas South-Eastern Railroad - see list of Texas railroads
Total Solar Eclipse - rare astronomical event
Total Sports Entertainment - Sports Entertainment Solutions and Services Company
Treated Sewage Effluent: see sewage treatment
fashion brand founded by Augustine Tse: "TSE the cashmere label".